Synchronisms is a series of twelve musical compositions for solo or ensemble live instruments and pre-recorded tape composed by Mario Davidovsky at the Columbia-Princeton Electronic Music Center, the first dating from 1963. Davidovsky explains that, "One of the central ideas of these pieces is the search to find ways of embedding both the acoustic and the electronic into a single, coherent musical and aesthetic space."

The series, "is characterized by the interaction of virtuoso musicians with a counterpoint of electronically generated sounds covering a broad tonal and timbral spectrum." Davidovsky describes the goals of his series: "In those works, I try to keep, on the one hand, as much as possible of what is characteristic of the electronic instrument [medium], and, on the other, what is characteristic of the live performer. At the same time, each extends the other." In the series Davidovsky attempts, "exact coordination only in short passages of intricate counterpoint; elsewhere, in more extended passages in which one component clearly accompanied the other, 'an element of chance ["leeway in the synchronization"] is introduced'".

The works are as follows:

 Flute (1963)
 Flute, clarinet, violin, cello (1963)
 Cello (1964)
 Chorus (1967)
 Percussion quintet (1969)
 Piano and electronic sound (1970)
 Orchestra (1973)
 Wind quintet (1974)
 Violin (1988)
 Guitar (1992)
 Bass (2005)
 Clarinet (2006)

Performance History
Synchronisms No's. 3, 6, 9, 11, and 12 were played at the Davidovsky Memorial Concert (2020) in Yellow Barn, Vermont

No. 6
Synchronisms No. 6, for piano and electronic sound (1970), was awarded the Pulitzer Prize for Music in 1971. Published by E. B. Marks, it was premiered August 19, 1970 at the Berkshire Music Festival.

No. 6 was written for pianist Robert Miller (of The Group for Contemporary Music). The Pulitzer jury found that the piece, "shows mastery of a new medium and its imaginative use in combination with the solo pianoforte." Violinist Mari Kimura, who studied with Davidovsky, cites Synchronisms No. 6 as prompting her initial interest in electronic music.

Recordings
Boston Musica Viva - Boston Musica Viva Plays Schwanter, Ives and Others (1987) [No. 3]
Aleck Karis - Secret Geometry (1996) [No. 6]
Jennifer Frautschi - Solovision (2003) [No. 9]
Davidovsky - Flashbacks (2000) [No. 10]
David Bowlin - Bird As Prophet (2019) [No. 9]
Michael Nicolas - Transitions (2016) [No. 3]

See also
Désintégrations
Synchronicity
Synchronization

Further reading
Gryč, Stephen Michael (1978). "Stratification and Synthesis in Mario Davidovsky's Synchronism No. 6, ITO 4/4: 8-39. M.M. thesis, University of Michigan.

References

External links
Susser, Peter Matthew. "Attack, Sustain and Decay: An Analysis of 'Synchronisms No. 3 for Cello and Electronic Sounds' by Mario Davidovsky", Music.Columbia.edu.

1963 compositions
Cycles (music)
Electronic compositions
Pulitzer Prize for Music-winning works